Thomas Farrow (March 8, 1833 – April 15, 1916) was a Canadian merchant and political figure. He represented Huron North in the House of Commons of Canada as a Liberal Conservative from 1872 to 1882 and Huron East as a Conservative member from 1882 to 1887.

He was born in Mumby, Lincoln County, England, the son of Martin Farrow, was educated there and came to Canada West in 1849. In 1858, he married Mary McDonald. He served as superintendent of schools for Wawanosh, Morris and Turnberry townships in Huron County for several years. Farrow was defeated by Peter Macdonald in his bid for reelection in 1887. He died in Collingwood at the age of 83.

References 

1833 births
1916 deaths
Conservative Party of Canada (1867–1942) MPs
Members of the House of Commons of Canada from Ontario